Transit Transit is the second studio album by American alternative rock band Autolux, released on August 3, 2010, on TBD Records (USA) and ATP Recordings (outside of North America/Japan).

Background
Autolux produced Transit Transit themselves with guitarist/vocalist Greg Edwards serving as engineer. Most of the record was recorded at Space 23, the band's makeshift studio in their rehearsal room near downtown Los Angeles. A few drum tracks - "Highchair", "Spots" and "The Science of Imaginary Solutions" - came from an earlier session with engineer John Goodmanson. The title track (the last song to be recorded) was recorded in Denmark by Edwards, using a virtually unplayable upright piano and a sample of a coffin-style freezer found in a nearby basement, and then finished back in Los Angeles.

"Audience No. 2" was self-released on May 21, 2008 to college radio while the band continued to write and record songs that would finally end up on Transit Transit. The single also included two B-sides: the instrumental track "Fat Kid" and a cover of the Beatles' "Helter Skelter".

Track listing

Credits
All songs written by Autolux
Produced by Autolux
Engineered by Greg Edwards at Space 23
Mixed by Kennie Takahashi and Dave Sardy
Mastered by Bob Ludwig
Artwork by Kill Pixie (aka Mark Whalen)

References

External links
Official Autolux website

2010 albums
ATP Recordings albums
Autolux albums